Cruz Pío Socorro Alvarado Bolado (3 May 1910 – 30 January 1984), known professionally as Crox Alvarado, was a Mexican actor who appeared in over 90 films. He was considered a popular star of the Golden Age of Mexican cinema.

Alvarado had been a professional wrestler before being an actor. He was also a caricaturist.

Selected filmography

 Bajo el cielo de México (1937)
 Song of the Soul (1938) - Oficial
 Men of the Sea (1938) - Rigobertito (uncredited)
 Cada loco con su tema (1939) - Secretario de notario (uncredited)
 The Cemetery of the Eagles (1939) - Capt. Alemán
 Horse for Horse (1939) - Empleado hotel (uncredited)
 El hotel de los chiflados (1939)
 Papacito lindo (1939) - Galán de cine
 Una luz en mi camino (1939)
 The Midnight Ghost (1940)
 Borrasca humana (1940)
 El barbero prodigioso (1942) - Octavio, amante de Fanny
 Jesús de Nazareth (1942) - Simón Cirineo (uncredited)
 Águila roja (1942) - Gilberto
 Iolanda (1943)
 Tierra de pasiones (1943) - Hijo de Leandro
 El misterioso señor Marquina (1943) - (uncredited)
 Saint Francis of Assisi (1944) - Honorio
 Nana (1944) - Fontan
 Las calaveras del terror (1944)
 Rosa de las nieves (1944)
 Tuya en cuerpo y alma (1945) - Hugo
 Recuerdos de mi valle (1946)
 Pasiones tormentosas (1946) - José
 Yo maté a Rosita Alvírez (1947) - Marcos (uncredited)
 La malagueña (1947) - Rogelio Garmendia
 Si Adelita se fuera con otro (1948) - Mayor Federico Enríquez
 Cortesã (1948)
 Spurs of Gold (1948) - Martín Vázquez
 La Mancornadora (1949) - Julio
 The Devil Is a Woman (1950) - Esteban
 El Desalmado (1950) - Mayor Rosales, Comandante de policía
 En carne viva (1951) - Fernando Herrera
 Toast to Love (1951) - Cadet
 The Magnificent Beast (1952) - David González
 Ambiciosa (1953) - Óscar Ramírez
 Rossana (1953) - Antonio
 Reportaje (1953) - Young doctor
 El enmascarado de plata (1954) - Julio
 Al son del charlestón (1954)
 Estoy taan enamorada (1954)
 El jinete sin cabeza (1957) - Don Álvaro
 Ladrón de Cadáveres (1957) - Capitán Carlos Robles
 The Aztec Mummy (1957) - Pinacate
 The Curse of the Aztec Mummy (1957) - Pinacate / El Ángel
 La marca de Satanás (1957)
 Secuestro diabolico (1957)
 Furias desatadas (1957)
 El caudillo (1957) - Panfilo Pardo
 The Robot vs. The Aztec Mummy (1958) - Pinacate
 El jinete negro (1958) - Hilarión Mercado
 The Tigers of the Ring (1960) - Mario / Emilio el Torbellino
 The Miracle Roses (1960) - Emperador Moctezuma
 Herencia trágica (1960) - Hilarión Mercado
 Bala de Plata en el pueblo maldito (1960) - Don Manuel
 La ley de las pistolas (1960) - El Yaqui Ramírez
 El torneo de la muerte (1960)
 El tiro de gracia (1961) - Panfilo Pardo
 Duelo indio (1961) - Panfilo Pardo
 El Bronco Reynosa (1961)
 El hijo del charro negro (1961) - Ciriaco
 Cazadores de cabezas (1962) - El Malayo
 Horizontes de sangre (1962)
 El Asaltacaminos (1962) - Hilarión Mercado
 La muerte en el desfiladero (1963)
 Los chacales (1963)
 Sitiados por la muerte (1963)
 La sombra blanca (1963)
 Face of the Screaming Werewolf (1964) - Redding's Bespectacled Aide
 Diablos en el cielo (1965)
 El rifle implacable (1965)
 La loba (1965) - Crumba
 El tigre de Guanajuato: Leyenda de venganza (1965)
 Juan Colorado (1966) - Amigo de Juan
 Juan Pistolas (1966)
 Los hermanos Centella (1967)
 El forastero vengador (1967)
 La isla de los dinosaurios (1967) - Caveman
 Los alegres Aguilares (1967) - Fermín
 El camino de los espantos (1967) - Zopilote
 Atacan las brujas (1968) - Lawyer / henchman
 La mujer murcielago (1968) - Inspector
 Duelo en El Dorado (1969) - Vereda - esbirro de Poveda
 Santo contra Capulina (1969) - Chief of Police
 Una rosa sobre el ring (1973) - Rodrigo Martinez, El Enmascarado Negro
 El tigre de Santa Julia (1974) - Cruz
 La corona de un campeon (1974)
 Alas doradas (1976)
 La sotana del reo (1979) - Comisario
 Chicoasén (1980)
 El sargento Capulina (1983)

References

External links

1910 births
1984 deaths
Costa Rican emigrants to Mexico
Mexican male film actors
Male actors from San José, Costa Rica
20th-century Mexican male actors
Costa Rican male film actors